A mountain river is a river that runs usually in mountains, in narrow, deep valley with steep banks, rocky stream bed, and accumulated rock debris.

Mountain rivers are characterized by high slope and flow velocity, insignificant depth, frequent rapids and waterfalls, as well as dominated washed out processes. The gradient of a mountain river is calculated at 60–80 m/km in upper stream and 5–10 m/km in lower. More precisely it is greater than or equal to 0.002 m/m along most of its stream length. Speed of stream is measured at 1 to 4.5 m/s and higher.

Mountain rivers have significant hydro energy producing potential and in arid conditions often used for irrigation.

See also
 Rapids
 Upland and lowland (freshwater ecology)

Bibliography
 Marynych, O. Geographical Encyclopedia of Ukraine. "Bazhan Ukrainian Encyclopedia". Kiev 1989.
 Wohl, E. Mountain rivers revisited. "AGU". Washington, D.C. 2010.

External links
 Electronic copy of the Wohl's book at Google Books

Rivers
Bodies of water
Limnology
Mountains